Atwode may refer to:
the Atwode people
the Atwode language
Thomas Atwode

See also
Atwood (disambiguation)